Antisana Ecological Reserve is a protected area in Ecuador situated in the Napo Province, Quijos Canton and Archidona Canton.

Flora and fauna

Rare animals and plants found in or near the reserve include:

 White-fronted spider monkey (Ateles belzebuth) – Endangered
 Northern pudu (Pudu mephistophiles) – Vulnerable
 Mountain tapir (Tapirus pinchaque) – Endangered
 Oncilla (Leopardus tigrinus) – Vulnerable
 Bush dog (Speothos venaticus) – Near Threatened
 Wattled guan (Aburria aburri) – Near Threatened
 Fuegian snipe (Gallinago stricklandii) – Near Threatened
 Andean condor (Vultur gryphus) – Near Threatened
 Spot-winged parrotlet (Touit stictopterus) – Vulnerable
 Greater scythebill (Campylorhamphus pucherani) – Near Threatened
 Southeastern giant antpitta, Grallaria gigantea gigantea – Vulnerable
 Giant conebill (Oreomanes fraseri) – Near Threatened
 Napo plump toad (Osornophryne antisana) – Endangered
 Senecio antisanae / Senecio iscoensis (= Aetheolaena senecioides?) – Data Deficient

Other notable flora and fauna of the park are, for example:
 Andean gull (Larus serranus)
 Silvery grebe (Podiceps occipitalis)
 Black-faced ibis (Theristicus melanopis)
 Oreopanax confusus 
 Chuquiraga jussieui

See also 
 Mikakucha
 Environment of Ecuador

External links 
 www.enjoyecuador.net / Antisana Ecological Reserve (Spanish)
 www.ambiente.gov.ec/ Antisana Ecological Reserve (Spanish)

Protected areas established in 1993
Nature reserves in Ecuador
Geography of Napo Province
Tourist attractions in Napo Province